Richard John "Rich" Preston (born May 22, 1952) is a Canadian ice hockey coach and former forward.

Born in Regina, Saskatchewan, Preston began his professional career in the World Hockey Association in the 1974-75 season with the Avco World Trophy champion Houston Aeros. He then played three more years with the Aeros before joining the Winnipeg Jets in 1978-79. The Jets won the Avco World Trophy in 1979 (the league's final year) and Preston was named Most Valuable Player of the WHA playoffs.

Preston started his National Hockey League career with the Chicago Black Hawks in 1980.  He also played for the  New Jersey Devils. He left the NHL after the 1987 season. Preston was an assistant coach for the Calgary Flames from the 2003-2004 NHL season until just after the 2008-2009 NHL season. Shortly after his dismissal from the Flames, Preston was hired as the WHL's Lethbridge Hurricanes head coach and general manager. After four years in Lethbridge without a single playoff game, Preston was fired from both roles before any team advanced past the first round of the 2013 WHL playoffs.

Prior to his NHL career, Preston played for the University of Denver Pioneers.

He currently is serving as a scout for the Anaheim Ducks.

He is the son of Ken Preston, general manager of the Saskatchewan Roughriders from 1958–1977 and a member of the Canadian Football Hall of Fame.

Career statistics

References

External links

1952 births
Anaheim Ducks coaches
Calgary Flames coaches
Canadian ice hockey forwards
Chicago Blackhawks coaches
Chicago Blackhawks players
Denver Pioneers men's ice hockey players
Houston Aeros (WHA) players
Lethbridge Hurricanes coaches
Living people
National Hockey League assistant coaches
New Jersey Devils players
Regina Pats coaches
San Jose Sharks coaches
Sportspeople from Regina, Saskatchewan
Undrafted National Hockey League players
Winnipeg Jets (WHA) players